Pon Megalai is a 2005 Indian Tamil language thriller film directed by Sakthi Chithran. The film stars Nithya Das, Abhinay and Charan Raj, with Charuhasan, Vijayan, T. S. Raghavendra, Naga Kannan, Anu Mohan, Anusha Raghavendra and Sona Heiden playing supporting roles. It was released in 2005.

Plot

The film begins with the news reporter Malarvannan (Abhinay) finding the bloodied and unconscious body of Megalai (Nithya Das) in a nun's dress near a railway track. Malarvannan and a local police inspector then visit the nearby church and ask the church father (Karvannan) to identify her at the hospital. At the hospital, the church father is shocked to see Megalai, as well as the minister Thandavarayan (T. S. Raghavendra) and the police inspector Gajapathi (Naga Kannan).

In the past, Megalai lived happily with her father Ramanathan (Charuhasan) and her little sister Sangeetha (Anusha Raghavendra). After the death of her father, Megalai had the duty of looking after her sister and finding a job. Megalai then sought her father's government job but the officer demanded sexual favours from her in return for the job and Megalai refused. She went to the beach to clear up her mind and stayed there the whole day. As night fell, some drunk men tried to misbehave with her and the police officer Gajapathi drove them out and took her to the police station. There, she came to know that Gajapathi had raped a lady constable. Gajapathi beat up the journalist who took the video of his rape and left the videocassette on his table, Megalai took it and ran away from the place. During the run, Megalai was hit by Thandavarayan's car and Thandavarayan took the unconscious Megalai at his home. When Megalai woke up, she listened to the minister's plan of putting a bomb in a hospital. She managed to escape from the place and the minister's goons, and she beat up a pervert who tried to rape her. Megalai then entered a church and begged the church father to help her, he suggested her to stay in his home. The church father turned out to be a fraud and tried to rape Megalai, during the clash, Megalai was injured in the head and fainted.

After she awakes in the hospital, Megalai tells all the events to the police inspector Soundarapandian (Charan Raj) and he vows to put the culprit in jail. The next day, Malarvannan finds the videocassette and gives it to Soundarapandian. Meanwhile, Gajapathi sneaks into the hospital to kill Megalai while two terrorists appointed by Thandavarayan try to put a bomb in the hospital. Soundarapandian manages to save Megalai by killing Gajapathi. Following a bomb alert, the patients and the medical staff try to leave the place but it exploded killing more than 200 people. The following day, minister Thandavarayan commits suicide whereas the fake church father dies after being electrocuted. The film ends with Soundarapandian congratulating Megalai for her braveness and Megalai finally finds a government job.

Cast

Nithya Das as Megalai
Abhinay as Malarvannan
Charan Raj as Soundarapandian
Charuhasan as Ramanathan
Vijayan
T. S. Raghavendra as Minister Thandavarayan
Naga Kannan as Gajapathi
Anu Mohan as Head Constable
Anusha Raghavendra as Sangeetha
Sona Heiden as Uma
Pandu as Thief
Kanakadurga
Kottai Perumal as Constable Perumal
Manager Cheena as Kailasam
Harish Ori as Police inspector
Sathyajith
Nirmal
Karvannan as Church father
S. V. Thangaraj as Singer
Robert in a special appearance

Production
Malayalam film actress Nithya Das was selected to play the lead role thus making her acting debut in Tamil cinema.

Soundtrack
The film score and the soundtrack were composed by Ilaiyaraaja. The soundtrack features 5 tracks.

Reception

Malini Mannath wrote, "Music is credited to Ilayaraja, but we hardly find the maestro's touch here [..] It's upcoming Malayalam actress Nithya Das' debut Tamil film. But like the rest of the cast, she hardly gets a chance to prove her mettle" and concluded, "the film has a lyrical title and that too a chaste Tamil one. But start viewing the film and you'll realise soon enough that the film is a far cry from the impression its title conveys".

References

2005 films
2000s Tamil-language films
Indian thriller films
Films scored by Ilaiyaraaja
2005 thriller films